"Dear Land of Guyana, of Rivers and Plains" is the national anthem of Guyana. Robert Cyril Gladstone Potter composed the music, while the lyrics were authored by Archibald Leonard Luker. Two separate contests were held to determine the words and the tune, respectively. It was adopted as the national anthem in 1966, when the country gained independence from the United Kingdom.

History
The British amalgamated the formerly Dutch colonies of Berbice, Demerara and Essequibo in 1814 into a single colony – British Guiana – and ruled over it until 1966. During the run up to independence in the early 1960s, several attempts were made by government committees to select the text to the new national anthem, but they all resulted in an impasse. Finally, in 1965, a fresh contest was held, and a new committee was formed, composed of individuals who possessed "broad literary and poetic backgrounds". The criteria they formulated for the anthem was that it should be august, inspire a love of country and evoke its unique characteristics, while at the same time be uncomplicated enough so that it could be comprehended by children. It was also supposed to be politically neutral, secular and dissimilar to the national anthems of other countries.

The competition saw a total of 266 entries submitted. The committee first narrowed this down to 40, and from that they chose 12 finalists. The lyrics penned by Archibald Leonard Luker were ultimately selected. A second contest was subsequently held to determine the music that was to accompany these lyrics. Another committee, consisting of a hundred people, selected from a blind audition. The identities of the composers were not revealed to them, so they chose from numbers that corresponded to the respective songs. In the end, a tune composed by Cyril Potter was chosen.

Lyrics
The first stanza of "Dear Land of Guyana, of Rivers and Plains" alludes to the country's geography. The other verses personify Guyana as a mother to its citizens, who have a duty of respect and protection of her.

References

External links
Guyana: Dear Land of Guyana, of Rivers and Plains - Audio of the national anthem of Guyana, with information and lyrics (archive link)
National anthem of Guyana MIDI File

Guyanese music
South American anthems
National symbols of Guyana
National anthems
National anthem compositions in B-flat major